Nanuca sebastiani is a species of sea slug, specifically an aeolid nudibranch. It is a marine gastropod mollusc in the family Facelinidae. It is the only species of the genus Nanuca.

Distribution
The holotype of this species was found at Recife, State of Pernambuco, Brazil. It has been reported from Florida, Cuba and Brazil
and Costa Rica as well as the Cape Verde Islands in the Eastern Atlantic Ocean.

References

Facelinidae
Gastropods described in 1957
Molluscs of the Atlantic Ocean
Molluscs of Brazil
Gastropods of Cape Verde
Molluscs of Central America
Invertebrates of Cuba
Monotypic gastropod genera